The name Gina has been used for six tropical cyclones worldwide.

In the South Pacific:
Cyclone Gina (1960) – Late-season storm that remained out to sea.
Cyclone Gina (1989) – Weak storm that impacted Samoa.
Cyclone Gina (2003) – an off-season Category 3 severe tropical cyclone that affected the Solomon Islands.
Cyclone Gina (2022) – a weak off-season storm that affected Vanuatu and New Caledonia.

In the Australian Region:
Cyclone Gina (1968) – Remained out to sea.

In the South-West Indian:
Tropical Storm Gina (1962) – Weak tropical storm that bought impacts to Madagascar and Mozambique.

South Pacific cyclone set index articles
Australian region cyclone set index articles
South-West Indian Ocean cyclone set index articles